Radica, Italian for briar root, may refer to:

Bogdan Radica (1904–1993), Croatian historian, journalist, diplomat, writer
Ruben Radica (1931–2021), Croatian composer
Naselje Stjepana Radića, settlement (naselje) in Vrbovec, Zagreb County, Croatia
Radica Games,  United States company that produces electronic games, founded in 1983

See also 
Radice
Radici (disambiguation)